The women's singles nine-ball competition at the 2001 World Games took place from 22 to 26 August 2001 at the Selion Plaza in Akita, Japan.

Last 16

Last 8

References

Cue sports at the 2001 World Games